This is a list of television manufacturers, past and present.

List

References

External links
 
 
 

Lists of consumer electronics manufacturers
Television lists